The following is a list of Malayalam films released in 1962.

Dubbed Films

1962
Malayalam
 Mal
 1962
1962 in Indian cinema